Kenneth Henry McLean (21 November 1922 – 14 November 1992) was an Australian rules footballer who played with Carlton in the Victorian Football League (VFL).

McLean served in the Australian Army during World War II, his overseas service in New Guinea in 1945 preventing him from playing that season.

Notes

External links 

Ken McLean's profile at Blueseum

1922 births
1992 deaths
Carlton Football Club players
Australian rules footballers from Victoria (Australia)